Hot Wax is the third solo album from Grant Hart, formerly of the band Hüsker Dü. It was released on October 6, 2009. The album followed Good News for Modern Man, released in 1999.

Recording
This album was recorded in both Montreal, Quebec and Minneapolis, Minnesota. The first sessions for the album were in 2005 and Hart traveled to Montreal a dozen times over three years to record with members of the bands Godspeed You! Black Emperor and A Silver Mt. Zion. However, with only half of the album finished, the traveling became an inconvenience. Hart also realized that “those guys didn’t necessarily want to chase the same exact pinpoint I was chasing.” The album was eventually finished in Minneapolis with Albatross Studio founder Mike Wisti.

Track listing
All songs written by Grant Hart.
 "You're the Reflection of the Moon on the Water" (4:20)
 "Barbara" (4:17)
 "Charles Hollis Jones" (4:23)
 "Schoolbuses Are for Children" (5:31)
 "Narcissus Narcissus" (2:44)
 "California Zephyr" (2:59)
 "Sailor Jack" (3:59)
 "I Knew All About You Since Then" (2:08)
 "My Regrets" (3:45)

Bonus Tracks

 "Khalid" (Listed between tracks 4 and 5 on Australian/New Zealand edition)

Personnel
 Grant Hart – vocals, instruments
 Efrim Menuck – handclaps, mixing on track 1
 Thierry Amar – bass viol, bass, handclaps, string arrangement on track 2
 Brian Litson – trumpet on track 2
 Genevieve Heistek – viola on track 2
 Sophie Trudeau – violin on track 2
 Jessica Moss – violin on track 2
 Beckie Foon – cello on track 2
 David Odegaard – bass on track 6
 Basia Bulat – vocals on track 9
 Howard Bilerman – recording, engineering on tracks 1, 2, 4, 9 
 Mike Wisti – recording, bass on track 7, engineering on track 3, 5, 6, 7, 8

References

External links
 [ Allmusic review: Hot Wax]

2009 albums
Grant Hart albums